The Mayor of Ancona is an elected politician who, along with the Ancona's City Council, is accountable for the strategic government of Ancona in Marche, Italy. The current Mayor is Valeria Mancinelli, a member of the Democratic Party, who took office on 11 June 2013.

Overview
According to the Italian Constitution, the Mayor of Ancona is member of the City Council.

The Mayor is elected by the population of Ancona, who also elects the members of the City Council, controlling the Mayor's policy guidelines and is able to enforce his resignation by a motion of no confidence. The Mayor is entitled to appoint and release the members of his government.

Since 1993 the Mayor is elected directly by Ancona's electorate: in all mayoral elections in Italy in cities with a population higher than 15,000 the voters express a direct choice for the mayor or an indirect choice voting for the party of the candidate's coalition. If no candidate receives at least 50% of votes, the top two candidates go to a second round after two weeks. The election of the City Council is based on a direct choice for the candidate with a preference vote: the candidate with the majority of the preferences is elected. The number of the seats for each party is determined proportionally.

1861–1946

Italian Republic (since 1946)

City Council election (1946–1993)
From 1946 to 1993, the Mayor of Ancona was elected by the city's Council.

Direct election (since 1993)
Since 1993, under provisions of new local administration law, the Mayor of Ancona is chosen by direct election.

See also
 Timeline of Ancona

References

Bibliography
 

Ancona
 
Politics of le Marche
Ancona